Tinaminae, the forest tinamous, is one of two subfamilies of the family Tinamidae, the other being Nothurinae. Tinaminae has more species than the other subfamily, containing 29 species in three genera:
 Crypturellus (21 species)
 Nothocercus (3 species)
 Tinamus (5 species)

Description
These birds, like other tinamous, are ground birds that prefer to run and walk, but will fly when they must. They differ physiologically by having their nostrils halfway down their bill or more.

They are a very compact muscular bird, with a slightly decurved beak. Their tail is short and rudimentary and appears near non-existent. They have a large amount of feathers on their back and posterior regions. some believe to assist in escaping predators by being able to shed feathers that have been grabbed.

Their plumage is drab and cryptic with colors of dark brown, rufous, and buff. They tend to be more uniform with less speckling and striping than their cousins of subfamily Nothurinae, the steppe tinamous. Some of the members of the genus Crypturellus are sexually dimorphic with the females being brighter and having more barring with the rest of the subfamily having only slightly larger females as the only difference in the sexes.

Taxonomy
The tinamous are related to the ratites (emus, ostriches, kiwis, and rheas), and are grouped with them in the superorder Paleognathae. All of these birds evolved from ancient birds that did fly; the tinamous are a primitive family closely related to these ancient birds.

Behavior
The larger members of the sub-family, and in particular Tinamus members roost in trees. They will fly to the branch with a noisy burst of flying while expending amounts of energy that they prefer not to. To make this an easier task, they will attempt to approach the branch from an uphill location so as to not need to gain as much altitude in flight. This technique is also used when they need to vacate quickly to avoid danger, in that they will fly downhill, so as to be able to cover greater distances before the need to touch down. When roosting they will not grip the branch with their toes, but rest on their folded legs. This is the reason the back of their tarsus is rough, and for their choice of branches being thick. They will use the same roost for an extended period of time, moving away from the roost to defecate so as to not plant easy evidence of their sleeping location to potential predators.

They tend to be a solitary bird and will usually only approach members of the same species during breeding season and only the opposite sex. However, some species do maintain contact with their mate year-round.

Voice
Tinamous in general are a very loud species, with clear, distinct, and sharp calls that reverberate throughout the area. These species are no exception. For example, the highland tinamou can be heard from several kilometers through the thick vegetation of the rain forest. Their calls tend to be deep and loud, designed to penetrate the many layers of the habitat that they frequent. They have many different calls and songs, each one serving a different purpose, for example, the solitary tinamou has as many as 11 different vocalizations, most of which can be linked to pairing, contact calling, or territorial defense. Some species, in particular, the members of Crypturellus have a regional variation in tone of their calls. In fact, some species, like the slaty-breasted tinamou have individually unique calls and can be recognized individually by humans based on these calls. Finally, members of Crypturellus have been known to use regular calling locations.

Feeding
Members of these genera, because of their residence in the forests, tend to eat fleshy fruit as their predominate choice of food. That is not to say they won't eat other objects, as they are a very opportunistic group. For example, they will also eat leaves, buds, and seeds, and will eat insects for variety. When eating, they prefer to eat their food of the ground but will grab it off low-hanging branches as well.

Some species require regular sources of water for hydration while others like the solitary tinamou can survive without a permanent source of water, and will gain their water from the succulent choices of fruit. When drinking, they are unlike most other birds in that they don't lift their heads bill high after imbibing to allow the liquid the use of gravity to help it down. Instead, they have the ability to suck and swallow.

Breeding
Tinaminae species normally practice a complex breeding strategy. This entails the males practicing simultaneous polygyny and the females practicing successive polyandry. Breeding season fluctuates with the species; however the majority of the species within the forest breed throughout the year, with an emphasis on when the food is most abundant.

They are a very territorial group of birds; however sometimes only during breeding season. When defending their territory against possible intruders, they can get extremely vocal, especially members of Crypturellus.

Courtship consists of males attracting the females with their continuous calling, then some species, like the male members of Tinamus will court the females by lowering his chest to the ground, stretch his neck forward, fluff up his posterior in an attempt to appear long.

When placing their nest, they will choose to do so at the base of a tree, in between several buttresses. Some species do not actually build a nest, choosing instead to lay their eggs on thin bed of leaves placed in a strategic location. The eggs of these birds have a wide range of coloring; however the do have similar features in that they are solid coloring, with no speckles or spots. Also they have a shiny, porcelain like quality. Finally, over time the colors fade and usually change to a different less bright color.

Once the eggs are laid the female moves on to find another male, to lay more eggs in another nest. Because of this there needs to be a disparate number of females to males, in fact the variegated tinamou has a 4:1 female to male ratio. Incubation ranges from 16 days in members of Crypturellus to 19–20 days in Tinamus. During this period the male does not call out unless he leaves the nest first.

Chicks hatch synchronously and gain maturity rapidly. When they are born, they have a downy coatof white, grey, or yellow coloration. Within 20 days, slaty-breasted tinamou have gained adult size, bit not weight.

Some species raise multiple broods per year, such as the slaty-breasted tinamou.

Movement
Tinamous are typically sedentary birds; however they do move in limited situations. For example, if the weather is not cooperating, such as flooding or drought, they will move to a different forest. Amazonian species will move from the varzea forest to the terra firme forests and back again.

Some species, like the slaty-breasted tinamou maintain a large home range, and will move within it seemingly at random.

Range and habitat
The members of this subfamily live in South and Central America, in the Neotropical region, and range from San Matias Gulf north to Tampico, Tamaulipas. They prefer to live in forests, unlike the Nothurinae, which do not require forests and can live in drier climates. They reside in a wide range of altitude, with Nothocercus occupying the higher elevations.

With the great number of species that reside in the forests of the southern and Central America, there is a need for a mechanism to allow similar species to live closely without strict competition. This is done by the use of micro-habitats. Panama gives a great example of the ecological separation of these birds. The highland tinamou occupies the highlands throughout the country. The great tinamou prefers the rain forests on the slopes. The Choco tinamou also like the rain forest, but they are limited to the southeast of the country. Finally, the little tinamou is found in dense secondary forest on either the Pacific or Atlantic slope above . With this, one will notice that the great and little tinamous both occupy similar habitats; however the size difference means that there is little direct competition for food.

Relationship with man
Tinamous have established themselves in the folklore and the histories of the indigenous people of South and Central America. Forest tribes of Brazil and Colombia believe the jaguar imitates the call of the great tinamou in order to track and eat it. A tale amongst the Guahibo Indians tells of a young man traveling by canoe trying to locate the calling tinamou. As he approached the bank he became suspicious at the harshness of the call and backed away just as a jaguar burst out of the vegetation.

Panamanian tradition states that after the "Great Flood", the great tinamou grew frightened of the bright colors in the rainbow. He flew away from the rainbow, the ark, and the rest of the animals, heading for the darkest part of the forest, where he has remained ever since.

Captive breeding, whereas is more successful and popular with members of Nothurinae, is done with members of Crypturellus in Rio Grande do Sul, Brazil.

Conservation

The population levels and thusly the need for conservation can be hard to determine due to the fact that their habitat is thick with vegetation, they are cryptically colored, and they are very secretive.

Forest birds and thence, the members of Tinaminae are threatened by deforestation and fragmentation. This is happening at an alarming rate in South America and in particular the Amazon. Farmers will slash-and-burn the forest to gain agricultural land, which due to the scarcity of nutrients, ends up being used for a short period of time before becoming desert and the process starts anew. These species, when this happens have to make a choice, either relocate, adapt, or die.

Of all the members of Tinaminae, six are considered near threatened and four are vulnerable according to IUCN, including the entire genus Tinamus.

The solitary tinamou, Tinamus solitarius, is another endangered tinamou. This bird is limited to the Atlantic forests of Brazil, Paraguay, and Argentina. Here it is threatened by habitat destruction and pressures from hunters. The government of Brazil has realized the need for protection of the remaining forests and the species.

In the cloud forests of northern South America, the black tinamou has less than 10,000 birds left, and the Tepui tinamou is in a unique situation. With the Tepui tinamou, the numbers suggest that it is doing well; however its range is so limited as it lives on the tops of a handful of plateaus in the cloud forests of Venezuela, that any problem could seriously jeopardize its numbers.

Footnotes

References
 
 

Paleognathae
Tinamous
Birds of South America
Birds of Central America